A Passage to Infinity : Medieval Indian Mathematics from Kerala and Its Impact  is a book by George Gheverghese Joseph chronicling the social and mathematical origins of the Kerala school of astronomy and mathematics. The book discusses the highlights of the achievements of Kerala school and also analyses the hypotheses and conjectures on  the possible transmission of Kerala mathematics to Europe.

An outline of the contents

 Introduction 
 The Social Origins of the Kerala School 
 The Mathematical Origins of the Kerala School
 The Highlights of Kerala Mathematics and Astronomy
 Indian Trigonometry: From Ancient Beginnings to Nilakantha
 Squaring the Circle: The Kerala Answer
 Reaching for the Stars: The Power Series for Sines and Cosines
 Changing Perspectives on Indian Mathematics 
 Exploring Transmissions: A Case Study of Kerala Mathematics
 A Final Assessment

See also

Indian astronomy
Indian mathematics
History of mathematics

References

Further references

In association with the Royal Society's 350th anniversary celebrations in 2010, Asia House presented a talk based on A Passage to Infinity. See : 
For an audio-visual presentation of George Gheverghese Joseph's views on the ideas presented in the book, see : 
The Economic Times talks to George Gheverghese Joseph on The Passage to Infinity. See : 
Review of "A PASSAGE TO INFINITY: Medieval Indian Mathematics from Kerala and its impact" by M. Ram Murty in  Hardy-Ramanujan Journal, 36 (2013), 43–46.

Hindu astronomy
Indian mathematics
Kerala school of astronomy and mathematics
Astronomy books